Gautam Shantilal Adani (born 24 June 1962) is an Indian billionaire industrialist who is the chairman and founder of Adani Group, a multinational conglomerate involved in port development and operations in India.

Adani has been described as being close to Indian Prime Minister Narendra Modi and his ruling  Bharatiya Janata Party. This has led to allegations of cronyism, as his firms have won many Indian energy and infrastructure government contracts after Modi became the Prime Minister of India. In January 2023, following accusations of stock manipulation and fraud, Adani's personal fortune has plummeted by over 60% to an estimated US$45.7 billion, as of March 2023, while falling to the 26th place on the Forbes and the Bloomberg Billionaires Index.

Early life 

Adani was born on 24 June 1962 in a Gujarati Jain family to Shantilal Adani (father) and Shantaben Adani (mother) in Ahmedabad, Gujarat. He has 7 siblings. His parents had migrated from the town of Tharad in the northern part of Gujarat. His father was a small textile merchant.

He was educated at Sheth Chimanlal Nagindas Vidyalaya school in Ahmedabad. He enrolled for a bachelor's degree in commerce at Gujarat University, but dropped out after the second year. Adani was keen on business, but not his father's textile business.

Career

As a teenager, Adani moved to Mumbai in 1978 to work as a diamond sorter for Mahendra Brothers.

In 1981, his elder brother Mahasukhbhai Adani bought a plastics unit in Ahmedabad and invited him to manage the operations. This venture turned out to be Adani's gateway to global trading through polyvinyl chloride (PVC) imports.

In 1985, he started importing primary polymers for small-scale industries. In 1988, Adani established Adani Exports, now known as Adani Enterprises, the holding company of the Adani Group. Originally, the company dealt in agricultural and power commodities.

In 1991, the economic liberalization policies turned out to be favorable for his company and he started expanding the businesses into trading of metals, textiles, and agro products.

In 1994, the Government of Gujarat announced managerial outsourcing of the Mundra Port and in 1995, Adani got the contract.

In 1995, he set up the first jetty. Originally operated by Mundra Port & Special Economic Zone, the operations were transferred to Adani Ports & SEZ (APSEZ). Today, the company is the largest private multi-port operator. Mundra Port is the largest private sector port in India, with the capacity of handling close to 210 million tons of cargo per annum.

In 1996, the power business arm of the Adani Group, Adani Power, was founded by Adani. Adani Power holds thermal power plants with a capacity of 4620MW, the largest private thermal power producer of the country.

In 2002, Adani was arrested by Delhi Police in execution of a non-bailable warrant(NBW), following a cheating complaint by a top of official of M S Shoes. The court withdrew the NBW the next day, after the court was informed that the parties were negotiating for a compromise.

In 2006, Adani entered the power generation business. From 2009 to 2012, he acquired Abbot Point Port in Australia and Carmichael coal mine in Queensland.

In 2012, the Serious Fraud Investigation Office (SFIO) had filed a charge sheet against twelve accused including the Adani for cheating & criminal conspiracy related to purchase and sale of shares. According to SFIO, Adani Agro allegedly provided funds and shares for running illegal activities. A local court in Mumbai discharged Adani & other accused of this case in May, 2014. However, in 2020, a Mumbai sessions court overturned the clean chit to Adani in this case.

In May 2020, Adani won the world's largest solar bid by the Solar Energy Corporation of India (SECI) worth US$6 billion. The 8000MW photovoltaic power plant project will be taken up by Adani Green; Adani Solar will establish 2000MW of additional solar cell and module manufacturing capacity.

In September 2020, Adani acquired a 74% stake in Mumbai International Airport, India's second busiest after Delhi.

In November 2021, while speaking at the Bloomberg India Economic Forum, Adani said the group is investing US$70 billion in a new green energy business. In July 2022, he offered new details on how this investment will be utilized to build three giant factories – solar, electrolyzer (to make green hydrogen), wind turbine plants.

In February 2022, he became Asia's richest person, surpassing Mukesh Ambani. In August 2022, he was named the 3rd richest person in the world by Fortune.

In May 2022, Adani family acquired Ambuja Cements and its subsidiary ACC from Swiss building materials giant Holcim Group for $10.5 billion, through an overseas special-purpose entity.

In August 2022, AMG Media Networks Limited (AMNL), a unit of Adani Group, declared that it planned to buy RRPR Holding, owner of 29.18% of national news broadcaster NDTV, and made an open offer to buy a further 26%. In a statement, NDTV said that Adani acquired his stake via a third party without informing the company's founders, former journalist Radhika Roy and her economist husband Prannoy Roy, and that the deal was done “without discussion, consent or notice.” This bid also raised concern regarding editorial independence in India, since Adani is considered to be close to Prime Minister Narendra Modi’s ruling Bharatiya Janata Party. By December 2022, Adani was described as controlling the largest shareholding in NDTV. The Economist said that before Adani bought NDTV, the news channel was "critical of the government but is now supine."

Allegations of fraud 
In January 2023, Adani and his companies were accused of stock manipulation by New York-based investment firm Hindenburg Research in a report titled "Adani Group: How The World's 3rd Richest Man Is Pulling The Largest Con In Corporate History". Following that, Adani Group stocks plummeted $45 billion. The losses resulted in Adani dropping from the 3rd richest person in the world to 22nd on Forbes' billionaires tracker. The report accused the group of having substantial debt and being on a "precarious financial footing", causing stocks of seven listed Adani companies to fall 3-7%. The report was released ahead of Adani Enterprises' follow-on public offering, which opened on Friday, 27 January 2023. The Adani Group's CFO (Jugeshinder 'Robbie' Singh) stated that the timing of the report's publication was a "brazen, mala fide intention" to damage the offering. The Adani Enterprises public offering was cancelled on 1 February 2023.

The Adani Group said that the Hindenburg Research report was "malicious combination of selective misinformation and stale" information, and that it was "evaluating the relevant provisions under U.S. and Indian laws for remedial and punitive action against Hindenburg Research". Alison Frankel (a senior legal writer at Reuters) wrote that it was unlikely that the Adani Group would sue Hindenburg in the U.S. because American courts usually regard financial analysis as protected opinion under American free speech laws. "The Adani Group has published a 413-page rebuttal to claims by Hindenburg Research".

Political views 

Adani personally maintains a negligible media presence but is widely known for being close to Indian Prime Minister Narendra Modi and his ruling Bharatiya Janata Party. This has led to allegations of cronyism as his firms have won many Indian energy and infrastructure government contracts. With an Indian government auditor accusing Modi in 2012 of giving low cost fuel from a Gujarat state-run gas company to Adani and other businesspeople.

Adani and Modi have both denied allegations of cronyism. The Economist has described Adani as a "a master operator", skilled at "navigating the complicated legal and political landscape of Indian capitalism," although the newsmagazine cautions that his firm is known for its "Byzantine" structure and opaque finances.

Personal life
Gautam Adani is married to Priti Adani. The couple have two sons, Karan Adani and Jeet Adani. 

In January 1998, Adani and an associate, Shantilal Patel, were allegedly abducted and held hostage for ransom. Two former gangsters Fazl-ur-Rehman and Bhogilal Darji, were accused of the kidnapping. They were acquitted in an Indian court in 2018, after Adani and Patel did not show up for depositions, despite multiple summons by the court.

Adani was in the restaurant of Taj Mahal Palace Hotel in Mumbai having dinner with another businessman at 21:50 on 26 November 2008 when the hotel was attacked by terrorists. Adani hid in the hotel kitchen and later in the toilet, and came out safely at 08:45 the next day.

Philanthropy
Adani's wife, Priti Adani, has been the chairperson of the Adani Foundation since she founded it 1996.  This is the corporate social responsibility (philanthropy) arm of the Adani Group, and has a presence in 18 states of India. 

In March 2020, Adani contributed  to the PM Cares Fund through his group's philanthropy arm, to fight the COVID-19 outbreak.

Adani led Adani Group imported four ISO cryogenic tanks filled with 80 metric tonnes of liquid medical oxygen from Dammam in Saudi Arabia to Mundra in Gujarat. The group also secured 5,000 medical-grade oxygen cylinders from Linde Saudi Arabia. In a Twitter post, Adani shared that each day his group is supplying 1,500 cylinders with medical oxygen to wherever they are needed in the Kutch district of Gujarat.
In June 2022, Adani has committed to donate Rs 60,000 crore ($7.7 billion) to social causes. Adani's corpus will be administered by the Adani Foundation, making it one of the biggest transfers to a philanthropic trust in India.

References

External links 

  
 

21st-century businesspeople
21st-century Indian Jains
Living people
Gujarati people
1962 births
Businesspeople from Ahmedabad
Indian billionaires
Indian industrialists
Adani Group
Gautam
Indian commodities traders
20th-century Indian businesspeople
Centibillionaires